Draba albertina is a species of flowering plant in the mustard family known as the Arc dome draba, slender draba or slender whitlow-grass.

Distribution 
This plant is native to western North America, where it grows at high elevations from Arizona to Alaska and northern Canada. Like many species of Draba, it can grow in alpine and Arctic climates.

Description 
This is a biennial or short-lived perennial with a single stem or several branching stems which may be very short or up to 40 centimeters in height. The appearance of the plant varies depending on the climate it endures. The leaves are up to 4 centimeters long, roughly hairy, and mostly basal, but there may also be some sessile leaves along the stem. The stem bears an inflorescence of up to about 30 small yellow flowers. The fruit is a silique up to two centimeters long.

External links
Jepson Manual Treatment
USDA Plants Profile
Photo gallery

References 

albertina